Iota Gruis, Latinized from ι Gruis, is a binary star system in the southern constellation of Grus. It has an apparent visual magnitude of 3.90, which is bright enough to be seen with the naked eye at night. The distance to this system, as determined using an annual parallax shift of 17.80 mas as seen from the Earth, is about 183 light years.

The yellow-hued primary component is an evolved K-type giant star with a stellar classification of K1 III.

References

K-type giants
Spectroscopic binaries
Grus (constellation)
Gruis, Iota
218670
114421
8820
Durchmusterung objects